Ice-Capades Revue is a 1942 American comedy film directed by Bernard Vorhaus, and written by Bradford Ropes and Gertrude Purcell. The film stars Ellen Drew, Richard Denning, Jerry Colonna, Barbara Jo Allen, Harold Huber and Marilyn Hare. The film was released on December 24, 1942, by Republic Pictures.

Plot
With her Massachusetts farm in debt, Ann Porter is amazed to hear a deceased uncle has bequeathed her his estate. When she and Aunt Nellie go to New York City to claim the inheritance, it turns out to be an ice-skating rink in rundown condition.

Jeff Stewart advises her to sell to ice-follies owner Duke Baldwin, but since Duke is a gangster who put her uncle out of business, Ann's not interested. She takes her skating troupe back to her farm's frozen pond and stages a show outdoors for friends and neighbors to see. A nutty professor, Theophilus J. Twitchell, is encountered by Nellie and vows to finance Ann's next show.

Jeff tries to make amends. He learns that Twitchell's "fortune" comes from a radio contest he intends to win. Jeff fixes it so that he secretly funds the professor's winnings. Duke tries to persuade Ann that he's still got Jeff in his pocket, but she sees through it and joins forces with Jeff to stage an all-new revue.

Cast   
Ellen Drew as Ann Porter
Richard Denning as Jeff Stewart
Jerry Colonna as Theophilus J. Twitchell
Barbara Jo Allen as Aunt Nellie
Harold Huber as Duke Baldwin
Marilyn Hare as Bubbles
Bill Shirley as Denny
Pierre Watkin as Wiley Stone
Si Jenks as Homer
Sam Bernard as Snake Eyes
George Byron as Master of Ceremonies
Vera Ralston as Ice-Capades Skater 
Megan Taylor as Ice-Capades Skater
Lola Dworshak as Ice-Capades Skater
Donna Atwood as Ice-Capades Skater
Robert Dench as Ice-Capades Skater 
Rosemarie Stewart as Ice-Capades Skater 
Larry Jackson as Ice-Capades Skater 
Bernard Lynam as Ice-Capades Skater 
Red McCarthy as Ice-Capades Skater 
Phil Taylor as Ice-Capades Skater
Joe Jackson Jr. as Ice-Capades Skater
Eric Waite as Ice-Capades Skater
Robin Lee as Ice-Capades Skater
Babs Savage as Ice-Capades Skater

References

External links
 

1942 films
American comedy films
1942 comedy films
Republic Pictures films
Films directed by Bernard Vorhaus
American black-and-white films
1940s English-language films
1940s American films
English-language comedy films